The Sultanate of Oman has created these orders of knighthood.
In chronological order:

 The Order of Al-Said ("Wisam Al-Sa'id") 1913 by Sultan Faisal bin Turki
 The Order of Oman (Wisam al-Oman), civil and military 1970
 The Most Honourable Order of Oman (Wisam Al-Sharif Al-Oman) 1982, Special class
 The Order of the Renaissance of Oman ("Wisam al-Nahdat al-Oman") 1972
 The Supreme Order of the Renaissance of Oman ("Wisam Nahisat Oman al-'Ali") 1982, Special class
 The Order of Merit of Sultan Qaboos ("Wisam Sahat Al-Jilalat al-Sultan Qaboos") or shortly "Sahab". 1977
 The Order of Excellence ("Wisam Al-Imtiaz") 1978
 The Order of N'Oman ("Wisam al Na'Oman") 1982
 The Order of Merit ("Wisam al-Istahqaq") or shortly  "Istahqaq". 1982
 The Order of Sultan Qaboos ("Wisam al-Sultan Qaboos") 1985
 The Order of the Special Royal Emblem (Wisam Al-Saghir A'ait Al-Sultaniat Al-Khasat") 1985
 The Sultan Qaboos Order for Culture, Science and Art ("Wisam Al-Sultan Quaboos Lilthaqafat wa Al-'Aloom wa Al-Fanoon") 1990
 The Order of Appreciation ("Wisam Al-Taqdir") 1990
 The Order of Achievement ("Wisam Al-Amajat") 1995

Sources 
 World Medals Index, Orders, Decorations and Medals of the Sultanate of Oman
 Antonio Prieto Barrio - Ribbon bars of Oman : page 1 - 2 - 3

Omani awards